Tajrud or Taj Rud may refer to:
 Tajrud, Qom
 Tajrud, Kashmar, Razavi Khorasan Province
 Tajrud, Torbat-e Heydarieh, Razavi Khorasan Province